The 2017 CFL Draft took place on Sunday May 7, 2017 at 7:00 PM ET on TSN and RDS. 71 players were chosen from among eligible players from Canadian universities, as well as Canadian players playing in the NCAA.

The draft was broadcast live on TSN for two hours and then subsequent coverage shifted to digital platforms on TSN.ca and TSN GO. The production was hosted by Farhan Lalji and featured the CFL on TSN panel which included Duane Forde, Chris Schultz, Dave Naylor, and Marshall Ferguson. Jim Lawson, the CFL's Chairman of the Board of Governors, announced the picks for the first two rounds at the TSN studios. This was announced following the resignation of current CFL Commissioner Jeffrey Orridge.

Top prospects 
Source: CFL Scouting Bureau rankings.

Trades
In the explanations below, (D) denotes trades that took place during the draft, while (PD) indicates trades completed pre-draft.

Round one
 Montreal → BC (PD). Montreal traded this selection to BC for the negotiating rights to Vernon Adams.
 Toronto → Winnipeg (PD). Toronto traded this selection, T. J. Heath, and a third-round pick in the 2018 CFL Draft to Winnipeg for Drew Willy.
 Winnipeg ←→ Calgary (D). Winnipeg traded the sixth overall selection to Calgary for the eighth overall selection and the 34th overall selection in this year's draft.

Round two
 None

Round three
 None

Round four
 Saskatchewan → Calgary (PD). Saskatchewan traded this selection to Calgary for Tevaughn Campbell.
 Winnipeg → Montreal (PD). Winnipeg traded this selection to Montreal for Kevin Glenn.
 Hamilton → Saskatchewan (PD). Hamilton traded this selection, Linden Gaydosh, Tommy Streeter, and a seventh-round pick in this year's draft to Saskatchewan for Justin Capicciotti and Xavier Fulton.
 Montreal → Saskatchewan (PD). Montreal traded this selection and a conditional second-round pick in the 2018 CFL Draft to Saskatchewan for Darian Durant.
 Calgary → Winnipeg (D). Calgary traded the 34th overall selection and the eighth overall selection to Winnipeg for the sixth overall selection in this year's draft.

Round five
 Montreal → Hamilton (PD). Montreal traded this selection, Khalid Wooten, and a sixth-round pick in this year's draft to Hamilton for Cierre Wood, Denzell Perine, a fifth-round pick in this year's draft, and a sixth-round pick in this year's draft.
 Hamilton → Montreal (PD). Hamilton traded this selection, Cierre Wood, Denzell Perine, and a sixth-round pick in this year's draft to Montreal for Khalid Wooten, a fifth-round pick in this year's draft, and a sixth-round pick in this year's draft.
 Winnipeg → Edmonton (PD). Winnipeg traded a conditional seventh-round selection to Edmonton for Matt Nichols. This later became a fifth-round selection after Nichols became Winnipeg's starting quarterback.

Round six
 Toronto → Montreal (PD). Toronto traded this selection and a conditional pick in the 2018 CFL Draft to Montreal for S. J. Green.
 Montreal → Hamilton (PD). Montreal traded this selection, Khalid Wooten, and a fifth-round pick in this year's draft to Hamilton for Cierre Wood, Denzell Perine, a fifth-round pick in this year's draft, and a sixth-round pick in this year's draft.
 Hamilton → Montreal (PD). Hamilton traded this selection, Cierre Wood, Denzell Perine, and a fifth-round pick in this year's draft to Montreal for Khalid Wooten, a fifth-round pick in this year's draft, and a sixth-round pick in this year's draft.

Round seven
 Hamilton → Saskatchewan (PD). Hamilton traded this selection, Linden Gaydosh, Tommy Streeter, and a fourth-round pick in this year's draft to Saskatchewan for Justin Capicciotti and Xavier Fulton.
 Edmonton → Hamilton (PD). Edmonton traded a conditional seventh-round selection to Hamilton for Brian Simmons. The draft pick was solidified after the condition was met.

Round eight
 None

Conditional trades
 Winnipeg → Hamilton (PD). Winnipeg traded a conditional selection to Hamilton for the negotiation list rights to Tajh Boyd. The condition was not met and Winnipeg did not transfer their selection to Hamilton.

Forfeitures
 Saskatchewan forfeits their third-round selection after selecting Kevin Francis in the 2016 Supplemental Draft.

Draft order

Round one

Round two

Round three

Round four

Round five

Round six

Round seven

Round eight

References

Canadian College Draft
2017 in Canadian football